Robert H. Shapiro (July 18, 1935 – August 21, 2004) was an American chemist. Shapiro was educated at the Stanford University, where he received his MS and Ph. D. In 1965 he became professor at the University of Colorado at Boulder, and from 1980 until his retirement in 1989 he worked at the James Madison University. He then became dean at the United States Naval Academy until his retirement in 1998.

References

1935 births
2004 deaths
20th-century American chemists
Stanford University alumni